Shaun Mehta is a Canadian writer. He has published one novel and one short story collection, and also collaborated with his brother, film director Richie Mehta, on the screenplay for Richie's debut film Amal, which was based on one of Shaun's short stories. Amal has won over 30 international awards.

Shaun and Richie Mehta were nominated for Best Adapted Screenplay at the 29th Genie Awards.

Works

Novels
 Divya's Dharma (2004)
 The Seven Vows (2017)

Trilogy
 Illuminated Shadows (2014 - 2016)

Short stories
 A Slice of Life (2005)

Children's books
 Shiloh's Forever Family (2020)
 Shiloh's Sleepy Time (2021)

Screenplays
Amal (2008)

He teaches and writes in Toronto, Canada.

All of Shaun's works are available on Amazon.

References

External links
 Official website

1989 births
Living people
Canadian male novelists
Canadian male short story writers
Canadian people of Indian descent
Canadian writers of Asian descent
Canadian male screenwriters
21st-century Canadian short story writers
21st-century Canadian novelists
21st-century Canadian male writers
21st-century Canadian screenwriters